Garguilo is a surname. Notable people with the surname include:

Joelle Garguilo (born 1986), American journalist, host, digital journalist, and reporter
Neil Garguilo (born 1982), American writer, producer, director, actor, and improv comedian

Surnames of Italian origin